Lone Rock is an unincorporated community on the coast of the Hood Canal in Kitsap County, Washington.

It gets its name from the glacial erratic boulder on the tidal flat about 400 feet off shore.

Lone Rock is one of a small collection of historic rural communities in the western part of Kitsap County, which includes Seabeck, Holly, Camp Union, Crosby and Hintzville. The Lone Rock community club defines Lone Rock as running along the coast from Seabeck to Olympic View and inland to Willamette Meridian Road and Newberry Hill Road. Little Beef Creek is widely regarded as the dividing line between Lone Rock and Seabeck. In this view, Lone Rock includes the Big Beef and Little Anderson Creeks and spans the smaller communities of Warrenville, Lawters Beach and Anderson Landing.

References

Bibliography
 

Unincorporated communities in Washington (state)
Unincorporated communities in Kitsap County, Washington
Landforms of Kitsap County, Washington
Glacial erratics of Washington (state)